The Greatest Thing I've Ever Learned is the debut LP by Alpha Rev.  The album was independently released in 2007, and then re-released on February 12, 2008 by Sea Change Records with an alternate track listing.

Original Independent Release
All songs written by Casey McPherson.
"China Sunrise"
"Wedding Day"
"Colder Months"
"Phoenix Burn"
"Stuck in a Crowd"
"The Beauty of Falling Down"
"Big Blow"
"When Did I Wake Up"
"Though I Walk (Lower Me Down)"
"Star of Wonder"
"Get Out"

2008 Re-Release
"Stuck in a Crowd"
"China Sunrise"
"Wedding Day"
"American Jesus"
"The Beauty of Falling Down"
"Midnight"
"My Situation"
"Big Blow"
"Though I Walk (Lower Me Down)"
"Ride Away"

References

Alpha Rev albums
2007 albums